Frederiksen Cabinet may refer to the following cabinets of Danish Prime Minister Mette Frederiksen:

Frederiksen I Cabinet (2019-Dec 2022)
Frederiksen II Cabinet (Dec 2022-present)